Hypostomus borellii is a species of catfish in the family Loricariidae. It is native to the upper and middle Pilcomayo River basin in Argentina, Uruguay, and Bolivia. The species reaches  standard length and is believed to be a facultative air-breather.

References 

Hypostominae
Freshwater fish of Argentina
Fish of Bolivia
Fish of Uruguay
Fish described in 1897
Taxa named by George Albert Boulenger